The surgeon's knot is a surgical knot and is a simple modification to the reef knot.  It adds an extra twist when tying the first throw, forming a double overhand knot.  The additional turn provides more friction and can reduce loosening while the second half of the knot is tied. This knot is commonly used by surgeons in situations where it is important to maintain tension on a suture, giving it its name.

Surgeon's knots are also used in fly fishing, in tying quilts, and for tying knots with twine; it is particularly useful in tying raw meat with butcher's twine, as the wet meat creates similar risks of loosening as surgery. Some sources categorize the surgeon's knot as a bend, since it can be effective as such.

Like the reef knot, the surgeon's knot capsizes and fails if one of the working ends is pulled away from the standing end closest to it.

Additional image

See also
 List of bend knots
 List of binding knots
 List of knots

References

Surgical procedures and techniques
Jewellery making
Fishing knots